The 2019–20 Minnesota Timberwolves season was the 31st season of the franchise in the National Basketball Association (NBA).

The season was suspended by the league officials following the games of March 11 after it was reported that Rudy Gobert tested positive for COVID-19. On June 4, 2020, the season came to an end for the Timberwolves when the NBA Board of Governors approved a plan that would restart the season with 22 teams returning to play on July 31, 2020 in the NBA Bubble, which was approved by the National Basketball Players Association the next day. Due to their poor record, the Timberwolves season came to an end. However the Timberwolves won the draft lottery giving them the 1st pick in the 2020 NBA Draft.

Draft

The Timberwolves held both a first and a second round draft pick.
The 11th pick along with Dario Šarić was traded to the Suns in exchange for the 6th pick Jarrett Culver.

Roster

Standings

Division

Conference

Game log

Preseason

|- style="background:#fcc;"
| 1
| October 8
| @ Phoenix
| 
| Karl-Anthony Towns (19)
| Karl-Anthony Towns (10)
| Shabazz Napier (7)
| Talking Stick Resort Arena7,593
| 0–1
|- style="background:#fcc;"
| 2
| October 10
| @ Golden State
| 
| Layman, Culver (17)
| Naz Reid (11)
| Josh Okogie (5)
| Chase Center18,064
| 0–2
|- style="background:#cfc;"
| 3
| October 13
| Maccabi Haifa
| 
| Treveon Graham (14)
| Noah Vonleh (8)
| Jarrett Culver (4)
| Target Center8,703
| 1–2
|- style="background:#cfc;"
| 4
| October 15
| @ Indiana
| 
| Karl-Anthony Towns (33)
| Robert Covington (19)
| Jeff Teague (7)
| Bankers Life Fieldhouse9,962
| 2–2
|- style="background:#fcc;"
| 5
| October 17
| @ Milwaukee
| 
| Karl-Anthony Towns (16)
| Robert Covington (11)
| Jeff Teague (5)
| Fiserv Forum16,148
| 2–3

Regular season

|- style="background:#cfc;"
| 1
| October 23
| @ Brooklyn
| 
| Karl-Anthony Towns (36)
| Karl-Anthony Towns (14)
| Shabazz Napier (7)
| Barclays Center17,732
| 1–0
|- style="background:#cfc;"
| 2
| October 25
| @ Charlotte
| 
| Karl-Anthony Towns (37)
| Karl-Anthony Towns (15)
| Karl-Anthony Towns (8)
| Spectrum Center14,879
| 2–0
|- style="background:#cfc;"
| 3
| October 27
| Miami
| 
| Andrew Wiggins (25)
| Karl-Anthony Towns (11)
| Jeff Teague (8)
| Target Center17,049
| 3–0
|- style="background:#fcc;"
| 4
| October 30
| @ Philadelphia
| 
| Andrew Wiggins (19)
| Towns, Okogie (6)
| Jeff Teague (5)
| Wells Fargo Center20,204
| 3–1

|- style="background:#cfc;"
| 5
| November 2
| @ Washington
| 
| Andrew Wiggins (21)
| Gorgui Dieng (8)
| Jeff Teague (13)
| Capital One Arena15,150
| 4–1
|- style="background:#fcc;"
| 6
| November 4
| Milwaukee
| 
| Andrew Wiggins (25)
| Josh Okogie (7)
| Napier, Dieng (4)
| Target Center16,271
| 4–2
|- style="background:#fcc;"
| 7
| November 6
| @ Memphis
| 
| Andrew Wiggins (30)
| Karl-Anthony Towns (13)
| Jarrett Culver (7)
| FedExForum13,503
| 4–3
|- style="background:#cfc;"
| 8
| November 8
| Golden State
| 
| Andrew Wiggins (40)
| Karl-Anthony Towns (14)
| Andrew Wiggins (7)
| Target Center15,647
| 5–3
|- style="background:#fcc;"
| 9
| November 10
| Denver
| 
| Wiggins, Towns (25)
| Karl-Anthony Towns (16)
| Karl-Anthony Towns (6)
| Target Center13,553
| 5–4
|- style="background:#cfc;"
| 10
| November 11
| @ Detroit
| 
| Andrew Wiggins (33)
| Karl-Anthony Towns (8)
| Karl-Anthony Towns (6)
| Little Caesars Arena12,526
| 6–4
|- style="background:#cfc;"
| 11
| November 13
| San Antonio
| 
| Andrew Wiggins (30)
| Karl-Anthony Towns (11)
| Andrew Wiggins (7)
| Target Center11,581
| 7–4
|- style="background:#fcc;"
| 12
| November 15
| Washington
| 
| Karl-Anthony Towns (36)
| Karl-Anthony Towns (10)
| Jeff Teague (11)
| Target Center12,716
| 7–5
|- style="background:#fcc;"
| 13
| November 16
| Houston
| 
| Karl-Anthony Towns (27)
| Karl-Anthony Towns (15)
| Jeff Teague (12)
| Target Center18,978
| 7–6
|- style="background:#cfc;"
| 14
| November 18
| @ Utah
| 
| Karl-Anthony Towns (29)
| Karl-Anthony Towns (13)
| Jeff Teague (11)
| Vivint Smart Home Arena18,306
| 8–6
|- style="background:#fcc;"
| 15
| November 20
| Utah
| 
| Andrew Wiggins (22)
| Karl-Anthony Towns (12)
| Jeff Teague (6)
| Target Center13,177
| 8–7
|- style="background:#fcc;"
| 16
| November 23
| Phoenix
| 
| Karl-Anthony Towns (31)
| Karl-Anthony Towns (17)
| Jeff Teague (8)
| Target Center17,362
| 8–8
|- style="background:#cfc;"
| 17
| November 25
| @ Atlanta
| 
| Karl-Anthony Towns (28)
| Karl-Anthony Towns (13)
| Teague, Towns (8)
| State Farm Arena16,218
| 9–8
|- style="background:#cfc;"
| 18
| November 27
| @ San Antonio
| 
| Andrew Wiggins (26)
| Karl-Anthony Towns (14)
| Teague, Towns (6)
| AT&T Center18,354
| 10–8

|- style="background:#fcc;"
| 19
| December 1
| Memphis
| 
| Karl-Anthony Towns (21)
| Karl-Anthony Towns (12)
| Andrew Wiggins (7)
| Target Center12,276
| 10–9
|- style="background:#fcc;"
| 20
| December 4
| @ Dallas
| 
| Wiggins, Towns (26)
| Karl-Anthony Towns (9)
| Karl-Anthony Towns (7)
| American Airlines Center19,671
| 10–10
|- style="background:#fcc;"
| 21
| December 6
| @ Oklahoma City
| 
| Jeff Teague (32)
| Robert Covington (7)
| Jeff Teague (9)
| Chesapeake Energy Arena18,203
| 10–11
|- style="background:#fcc;"
| 22
| December 8
| @ L. A. Lakers
| 
| Wiggins, Towns (19)
| Jordan Bell (6)
| Karl-Anthony Towns (8)
| Staples Center18,997
| 10–12
|- style="background:#fcc;"
| 23
| December 9
| @ Phoenix
| 
| Karl-Anthony Towns (33)
| Karl-Anthony Towns (15)
| Teague, Wiggins (4)
| Talking Stick Resort Arena13,230
| 10–13
|- style="background:#fcc;"
| 24
| December 11
| Utah
| 
| Jeff Teague (32)
| Karl-Anthony Towns (11)
| Jeff Teague (6)
| Target Center12,369
| 10–14
|- style="background:#fcc;"
| 25
| December 13
| L. A. Clippers
| 
| Karl-Anthony Towns (39)
| Karl-Anthony Towns (12)
| Jeff Teague (5)
| Target Center17,585
| 10–15
|- style="background:#fcc;"
| 26
| December 18
| New Orleans
| 
| Andrew Wiggins (27)
| Gorgui Dieng (8)
| Jeff Teague (9)
| Target Center12,490
| 10–16
|- style="background:#fcc;"
| 27
| December 20
| @ Denver
| 
| Andrew Wiggins (19)
| Jordan Bell (8)
| Andrew Wiggins (6)
| Pepsi Center19,520
| 10–17
|- style="background:#fcc;"
| 28
| December 21
| @ Portland
| 
| Andrew Wiggins (33)
| Gorgui Dieng (12)
| Jeff Teague (8)
| Moda Center19,393
| 10–18
|- style="background:#fcc;"
| 29
| December 23
| @ Golden State
| 
| Andrew Wiggins (22)
| Dieng, Vonleh (8)
| Teague, McLaughlin (4)
| Chase Center18,064
| 10–19
|- style="background:#cfc;"
| 30
| December 26
| @ Sacramento
| 
| Gorgui Dieng (21)
| Gorgui Dieng (15)
| Shabazz Napier (9)
| Golden 1 Center17,583
| 11–19
|- style="background:#fcc;"
| 31
| December 28
| Cleveland
| 
| Jeff Teague (18)
| Noah Vonleh (9)
| Jeff Teague (4)
| Target Center15,411
| 11–20
|- style="background:#cfc;"
| 32
| December 30
| Brooklyn
| 
| Shabazz Napier (24)
| Gorgui Dieng (20)
| Shabazz Napier (8)
| Target Center15,824
| 12–20

|- style="background:#fcc;"
| 33
| January 1
| @ Milwaukee
| 
| Shabazz Napier (22)
| Robert Covington (11)
| Jarrett Culver (5)
| Fiserv Forum17,819
| 12–21
|- style="background:#cfc;"
| 34
| January 2
| Golden State
| 
| Napier, Covington (20)
| Robert Covington (10)
| Shabazz Napier (7)
| Target Center15,477
| 13–21
|- style="background:#cfc;"
| 35
| January 5
| @ Cleveland
| 
| Gorgui Dieng (22)
| Gorgui Dieng (13)
| Shabazz Napier (7)
| Rocket Mortgage FieldHouse16,159
| 14–21
|- style="background:#fcc;"
| 36
| January 7
| @ Memphis
| 
| Jarrett Culver (24)
| Covington, Vonleh (6)
| Jeff Teague (6)
| FedExForum14,117
| 14–22
|- style="background:#cfc;"
| 37
| January 9
| Portland
| 
| Andrew Wiggins (23)
| Gorgui Dieng (10)
| Andrew Wiggins (8)
| Target Center13,720
| 15–22
|- style="background:#fcc;"
| 38
| January 11
| @ Houston
| 
| Josh Okogie (16)
| Jarrett Culver (8)
| Okogie, Culver (5)
| Toyota Center18,055
| 15–23
|- style="background:#fcc;"
| 39
| January 13
| Oklahoma City
| 
| Naz Reid (20)
| Okogie, Culver, Napier (5)
| Jeff Teague (5)
| Target Center11,044
| 15–24
|- style="background:#fcc;"
| 40
| January 15
| Indiana
| 
| Jarrett Culver (17)
| Gorgui Dieng (11)
| Shabazz Napier (9)
| Target Center12,648
| 15–25
|- style="background:#fcc;"
| 41
| January 17
| @ Indiana
| 
| Karl-Anthony Towns (27)
| Robert Covington (10)
| Shabazz Napier (9)
| Bankers Life Fieldhouse16,248
| 15–26
|- style="background:#fcc;"
| 42
| January 18
| Toronto
| 
| Jarrett Culver (26)
| Andrew Wiggins (10)
| Andrew Wiggins (11)
| Target Center16,520
| 15–27
|- style="background:#fcc;"
| 43
| January 20
| Denver
| 
| Karl-Anthony Towns (28)
| Towns, Okogie (8)
| Shabazz Napier (8)
| Target Center12,172
| 15–28
|- style="background:#fcc;"
| 44
| January 22
| @ Chicago
| 
| Karl-Anthony Towns (40)
| Covington, Dieng, Napier (7)
| Andrew Wiggins (9)
| United Center18,875
| 15–29
|- style="background:#fcc;"
| 45
| January 24
| Houston
| 
| Karl-Anthony Towns (30)
| Karl-Anthony Towns (12)
| Keita Bates-Diop (6)
| Target Center16,101
| 15–30
|- style="background:#fcc;"
| 46
| January 25
| Oklahoma City
| 
| Karl-Anthony Towns (37)
| Shabazz Napier (10)
| Shabazz Napier (13)
| Target Center16,236
| 15–31
|- style="background:#fcc;"
| 47
| January 27
| Sacramento
| 
| Andrew Wiggins (36)
| Andrew Wiggins (9)
| Napier, Wiggins (8)
| Target Center13,449
| 15–32

|- style="background:#fcc;"
| 48
| February 1
| @ L. A. Clippers
| 
| Karl-Anthony Towns (32)
| Karl-Anthony Towns (12)
| Shabazz Napier (10)
| Staples Center19,068
| 15–33
|- style="background:#fcc;"
| 49
| February 3
| @ Sacramento
| 
| Karl-Anthony Towns (22)
| Karl-Anthony Towns (10)
| Shabazz Napier (7)
| Golden 1 Center15,819
| 15–34
|- style="background:#fcc;"
| 50
| February 5
| Atlanta
| 
| Andrew Wiggins (25)
| Karl-Anthony Towns (11)
| Jordan McLaughlin (7)
| Target Center10,779
| 15–35
|- style="background:#cfc;"
| 51
| February 8
| L. A. Clippers
| 
| Jordan McLaughlin (24)
| Karl-Anthony Towns (13)
| Jordan McLaughlin (11)
| Target Center18,978
| 16–35
|- style="background:#fcc;"
| 52
| February 10
| @ Toronto
| 
| Karl-Anthony Towns (23)
| Karl-Anthony Towns (10)
| Karl-Anthony Towns (7)
| Scotiabank Arena19,800
| 16–36
|- style="background:#fcc;"
| 53
| February 12
| Charlotte
| 
| Malik Beasley (28)
| Juan Hernangómez (12)
| D'Angelo Russell (11)
| Target Center18,978
| 16–37
|- style="background:#fcc;"
| 54
| February 21
| Boston
| 
| Malik Beasley (27)
| Naz Reid (9)
| D'Angelo Russell (13)
| Target Center18,978
| 16–38
|- style="background:#fcc;"
| 55
| February 23
| @ Denver
| 
| Kelan Martin (21)
| Malik Beasley (8)
| Jordan McLaughlin (10)
| Pepsi Center19,626
| 16–39
|- style="background:#fcc;"
| 56
| February 24
| @ Dallas
| 
| D'Angelo Russell (29)
| Culver, Martin (6)
| D'Angelo Russell (5)
| American Airlines Center19,936
| 16–40
|- style="background:#cfc;"
| 57
| February 26
| @ Miami
| 
| D'Angelo Russell (27)
| Malik Beasley (6)
| D'Angelo Russell (6)
| American Airlines Arena19,600
| 17–40
|- style="background:#fcc;"
| 58
| February 28
| @ Orlando
| 
| D'Angelo Russell (28)
| Juan Hernangómez (13)
| D'Angelo Russell (7)
| Amway Center18,846
| 17–41

|- style="background:#fcc;"
| 59
| March 1
| Dallas
| 
| D'Angelo Russell (16)
| Hernangómez, Reid (12)
| D'Angelo Russell (7)
| Target Center18,058
| 17–42
|- style="background:#cfc;"
| 60
| March 3
| @ New Orleans
| 
| Malik Beasley (28)
| Naz Reid (14)
| D'Angelo Russell (8)
| Smoothie King Center15,264
| 18–42
|- style="background:#cfc;"
| 61
| March 4
| Chicago
| 
| Malik Beasley (24)
| Naz Reid (11)
| Jordan McLaughlin (7)
| Target Center13,392
| 19–42
|- style="background:#fcc;"
| 62
| March 6
| Orlando
| 
| Malik Beasley (29)
| Juan Hernangómez (8)
| Jordan McLaughlin (9)
| Target Center14,315
| 19–43
|- style="background:#fcc;"
| 63
| March 8
| New Orleans
| 
| Malik Beasley (21)
| Malik Beasley (9)
| D'Angelo Russell (5)
| Target Center18,978
| 19–44
|- style="background:#fcc;"
| 64
| March 10
| @ Houston
| 
| D'Angelo Russell (28)
| Juan Hernangómez (10)
| D'Angelo Russell (5)
| Toyota Center18,055
| 19–45

|- style="background:#;"
| 65
| March 13
| @ Oklahoma City
| 
|
|
|
| Chesapeake Energy Arena
|
|- style="background:#;"
| 66
| March 14
| @ San Antonio
| 
|
|
|
| AT&T Center
|
|- style="background:#;"
| 67
| March 17
| @ Portland
| 
|
|
|
| Moda Center
|
|- style="background:#;"
| 68
| March 18
| @ Phoenix
| 
|
|
|
| Talking Stick Resort Arena
|
|- style="background:#;"
| 69
| March 20
| @ Utah
| 
|
|
|
| Vivint Smart Home Arena
|
|- style="background:#;"
| 70
| March 22
| Portland
| 
|
|
|
| Target Center
|
|- style="background:#;"
| 71
| March 24
| Philadelphia
| 
|
|
|
| Target Center
|
|- style="background:#;"
| 72
| March 26
| San Antonio
| 
|
|
|
| Target Center
|
|- style="background:#;"
| 73
| March 29
| @ Boston
| 
|
|
|
| TD Garden
|
|- style="background:#;"
| 74
| March 30
| LA Lakers
| 
|
|
|
| Target Center
|
|- style="background:#;"
| 75
| April 1
| Dallas
| 
|
|
|
| Target Center
|
|- style="background:#;"
| 76
| April 3
| @ New York
| 
|
|
|
| Madison Square Garden
|
|- style="background:#;"
| 77
| April 5
| Detroit
| 
|
|
|
| Target Center
|
|- style="background:#;"
| 78
| April 7
| Phoenix
| 
|
|
|
| Target Center
|
|- style="background:#;"
| 79
| April 9
| Sacramento
| 
|
|
|
| Target Center
|
|- style="background:#;"
| 80
| April 12
| @ LA Lakers
| 
|
|
|
| Staples Center
|
|- style="background:#;"
| 81
| April 13
| @ LA Clippers
| 
|
|
|
| Staples Center
|
|- style="background:#;"
| 82
| April 15
| New York
| 
|
|
|
| Target Center
|

Transactions

Trades

Free agents

Re-signed

Additions

Subtractions

Notes

References

2019-20
Minnesota Timberwolves
2019 in sports in Minnesota
2020 in sports in Minnesota